Dorigo is an Italian surname. Notable people with the surname include:

 Aldo Dorigo (born 1929), Italian footballer
 Marco Dorigo (born 1961), Italian scientist
 Max Dorigo (born 1936), French basketball player
 Tony Dorigo (born 1965), Australian-born English footballer

Italian-language surnames